Deepak Shimkhada (born September 5, 1945) is a Nepali American educator, artist, art historian, author and community leader. He currently serves as an adjunct professor at Chaffey College in Rancho Cucamonga, California. He has previously held visiting and adjunct appointments at several universities in the United States, including Scripps College, Claremont Graduate University, California State University, Northridge, University of the West and Claremont School of Theology. His teaching career began in 1980 and although he is fully retired from full-time teaching, he currently teaches Asian art part-time at Chaffey College.

He is the founding president of the Foundation for Indic Philosophy and Culture (Indic Foundation) and the Himalayan Arts Council. He has served on the boards of several organizations, including Asian Studies on the Pacific Coast and the America-Nepal Society of California (the latter as president). He served on the Board of Visitors of the School of Religion at Claremont Graduate University as Chair of the Hindu Council from 2006 to 2012. He is also a founding board member of the South Asian Studies Association.

A well-published author of many journal and newspaper articles, book chapters and edited books, he has also exhibited his paintings and graphics in group and one-man shows in Nepal, India, Japan and the U.S. Notably, he has appeared as a commentator in several episodes of the History Channel series Ancient Aliens.

Early life and education
Shimkhada was born on September 5, 1945 in Darkha, Nepal to Ratna Prasad Shimkhada and Kausalya Devi Shimkhada. He attended JP High School in Kathmandu and completed SLC in 1960. He completed IA in Economics from Saraswati College in Kathmandu in 1962.

In 1962, upon receiving a scholarship from the Government of India, Shimkhada left for India to pursue higher education in fine arts. He studied at The Maharaja Sayajirao University of Baroda and received a bachelor's degree in fine arts in 1968. He received his master's degree in fine arts with a focus on art criticism in 1970 from the same university. In 1972, he received a Fulbright fellowship to study art history and moved to Los Angeles in the United States. He is considered among the first few Nepalis to immigrate to the U.S. He earned his Master of Arts in art history from the University of Southern California in 1975. Shimkhada earned his PhD in Education from Claremont Graduate University in 2001. His dissertation was in art and religion using semiotics as a methodology to analyze them.

Career

Fine arts career

Shimkhada's professional career as an artist began in 1968 when he had his first one-man show of paintings in Max Gallery in Kathmandu, Nepal.  In 1971, in the second Triennale of World Contemporary Art held in New Delhi, India, one of his paintings was selected as the best work from Nepal and was featured in its exhibition catalogue. He had several private shows of his works in Beverly Hills, California in 1973 and 1974. He exhibited his last work in Chicago Public Library in 1977.

Teaching career
Shimkhada began his teaching career as a lecturer of Asian art history at Scripps College in Claremont, California in 1980. At that time he had just returned from India after conducting his field research for his PhD dissertation under the aegis of American Institute of Indian Studies (AIIS). Since 1980 he has lived in Claremont and has performed various duties as administrator and professor teaching art history at various colleges and universities in Southern California.

Although his articles on Nepali art, culture, philosophy, and religion began to appear in various newspapers and journals in Nepal in the early 1970s, Shimkhada's major research writings about them took place in 1973 when his first paper was published by "Arts of Asia" followed by a series of articles by "Artibus Asiae" and "Oriental Art" in 1983.

Writings
Shimkhada’s research focuses on art, philosophy, religion, history, and science. The following writings reflect a relationship between them. His books include The Constant and Changing Faces of the Goddess: Goddess Traditions of Asia, Popular Buddhist Mantras in Sanskrit, Himalayas at the Crossroads: Portraits of a Changing World, Nepal: Nostalgia and Modernity, South Asian Studies: Bridging Cultures, and As the World Churns: A Legend Where Reality and Myth Blend. He has contributed chapters to The Constant and Changing Faces of the Goddess, Health and Religious Rituals in South Asia: Diseases, Possession, Healing, and Sangama: A Confluence of Art and Culture During the Vijayanagara Period, Contemporary Hinduism, Modern Hinduism in Text and Context, and South Asian Studies: Bridging Cultures.  He is the author of many art historical articles published in peer-reviewed and non-reviewed journals such as NAFA Art Magazine, Arts of Asia, Orientations, Artibus Asiae, Oriental Art, The Journal of Asian Studies, The Himalayan Research Bulletin, The Journal of Dharma Studies, Voice of Ulan Bator, Himalaya, Folk Dance Scene. His articles have also appeared in newspapers: The Overseas Times, India West, Rising Nepal, and others in Nepali vernacular. He has written six children's books.

Books

Books (authored and edited)
 (2022) Nepal, a Shangri-La? Narratives of Culture, Contact, and Memory. Kathmandu: Mandala Books. ISBN 978-99933-42-58-8
 (2020) As the World Churns: A Legend Where Reality and Myth Blend. Indic Foundation: California, 
 (2020) South Asian Studies: Bridging Cultures. SASA Books, San Bernardino, California. 
 (2011) Nepal: Nostalgia and Modernity, Marg Foundation, Mumbai 
 (2008) The Constant and Changing Faces of the Goddess: Goddess Traditions of Asia, Cambridge Scholars Publishing, Newcastle 
 (1987) Himalayas at the Crossroads: Portrait of a Changing World, Pacific Asia Museum,  Pasadena, California
 (1985) Popular Buddhist Mantras in Sanskrit, (co-authored with Shih Pei Lai), Mahayana Vihara Press, Taipei

Autobiography
 (2022) Nepal to California: A Life of Adventure and Memories. Los Angeles: Shangri-la Books.

Book chapters
 (2022) "The Sound of Dhime: Identity of the Jyapu People" in Nepal: A Shangri-La? Narratives of Culture, Contact, and Memory. Kathmandu: Mandala Books. Edited by Deepak Shimkhada, et al. Kathmandu: Mandala Books
 (2020) The Cosmic Dance of Kali and the Black Hole coauthored with LaChelle Schilling, p.178-197 in South Asian Studies: Bridging Cultures, Edited by Deepak Shimkhada, SASA Books.
 (2019) Uterus, p. 290-296 in She Rises: What Goddess Feminism, Activism, and Spirituality? Volume 3, Edited by Helen Hye-Sook Hwang, et al., Mago publishers.
 (2019) Finding our agency and awareness of Seeds of Life, co-authored with LaChelle Schilling, p. 351-359 in She Rises: What Goddess Feminism, Activism, and Spirituality? Volume 3, Edited by Helen  Hye-Sook Hwang, et al., Mago publishers, 2019.
 (2018) Sacred Grove: The Playground of the Gods in Modern Hinduism in Text and Context edited by Lavanya Vemsani, Bloomsbury Academic Publishing. 
 (2013) Nepali Hindus in Southern California, in Contemporary Hinduism, P. Pratap Kumar (ed.), Durham: Acumen, 
 (2011) Kumari: Today and Tomorrow, in Nepal: Nostalgia and Modernity, Deepak Shimkhada (ed.), Marg Publishers, Mumbai,  
 (2010) Shamanic Healing: A Jhankri in the City in Health and Religious Rituals in South Asia, Fabrizio M. Ferrari (ed.), Routledge Publishers, UK  
 (2008) Goma: An Embodiment of the Goddess in The Constant and Changing Faces of the Goddess: Goddess Traditions of Asia, Deepak Shimkhada and Phyllis K. Herman (ed.), Cambridge Scholars  Press, 
 (2005) Being in Love with God is not Enough: Social Reform by Basavanna Through Bhakti in  Sangama: Confluence of Art and Architecture, Nalini Rao (ed.), Originals, Delhi

Children's books
 (2022) Meeting Babaji. Shangri-La Books
 (2022) Hunt for a Relic. Shangri-La Books
 (2021) The Planet of the Dogs. Shangri-La Books
 (2021) The Lotus Chronicles Book Two: The Power of Two. Indic Books: Foundation for Indic Philosophy and Culture
 (2020) The Lotus Chronicles Book One: Jaya Confronts the Lord of Darkness. Indic Books: Foundation for Indic Philosophy and Culture. 
 (2020) Surabhi The Wish-Fulfilling Cow: An Ancient Legend for Today. Indic Books: Foundation and Indic Philosophy and Culture
 (2014) Arjun Confronts Bullies at School. CreateSpace,  
 (2013) How Ganesha Outwitted His Brother to Circle the Universe. CreateSpace,  
 (2013) Thunder Rumbles in Preeti's House,. CreateSpace,  
 (2013) How Arjun and His Dad Outfox the Wolves. CreateSpace,

Journals
 (2022) "Tushā Hiti: The Origin and Significance of the Name" in Monsoon: The Journal of South Asian Studies Association, Vol.1, No. 1, pp. 11-19.
 (2019) “Mata Tirtha: A Sacred Geography” in Journal of Dharma Studies, April, 2019.
(2015) Deepak Shimkhada with Michael Reading, “Return to the womb: feminine creative imagery of arghya in a Tantric ritual” in International Journal of Dharma Studies (2015) 3:12.
 (2014) “The Date of the Chandi Murals in the Hanuman Dhoka Palace: Where History and Faith Meet”, AsianArt.com
 (2011) Deepak Shimkhada with Adam Pave,“Expressions of Love: Images from the 1648 Bhagavata Purana Manuscript”, Exemplar: The Journal of the South Asian Studies Association. 
 (2008) “The Future of Nepal’s “Living” Goddess: Is Her Death Necessary?" Asian Art.
 (2007) "Oil Lamps as Expressions of Devotion," Marg (Mumbai, India), pp. 102–103
 (2005) "Book Review, Ethnic Revival and Religious Turmoil: Identities and Representations in the Himalayas”, in The Journal of Asian Studies, Vol.64, No.4, pp. 1059–1061, Marie Lecomte-Tilouine and Pascale Dollfus (ed.), New York: Oxford University Press, 2003 
 (2000) "Erotic Body & Exotic Costumes," in Proceedings of the 32nd International Congress on Research in Dance, Claremont, California, pp. 30– 36
 (1990) "Wind Horses: Prayer Flags in the Himalayas," in Arts of Asia, (Hong Kong), Oct–Nov
 (1989) Deepak Shimkhada with Muriel Reeves, "Narayana: The Sleeping Vishnu" in Arts of Asia (Hong Kong), Vol. 19, No. 1 (Jan–Feb), pp. 152–155
 (1988) "Forms of Nepali Folk Dance" in Folk Dance Scene, November, Volume 23, Number 8, p. 12–14.
 (1986) "Interaction between Painting and Architecture in Nepali Art," in Himalayan Research Bulletin (New York: Cornell University), Vol. 6, No. 1, Winter, PP. 20–22
 (1984) "The Masquerading Sun: A Unique Image from Nepal", in Artibus Asiae (Switzerland), University of New York, Vol. 45, No. 4, pp. 223–230
 (1984) "Pratapamalla's Pilgrimage: An Historical Painting from Nepal," in Oriental Art (London), Vol. 30, No. 4, Winter pp. 368–70
 (1984) "Museum without Walls: Wayside Sculptures in the Kathmandu Valley," in Arts of Asia (Hong Kong), Vol. 14, No. 4, July–August, pp. 97–100
 (1983) "A Preliminary Study of the Game of Karma in India, Nepal, and Tibet," in Artibus Asiae (Switzerland: Institute of Fine Arts, New York), Vol. LXIV, No. 4, pp. 308–322
 (1983) "The Sunken Bath of Siddhinarasimha Malla in Patan," in Orientations, Vol. 14, No. 7, July, pp. 46–49
 (1982) "Measure of Karma: Origin and Iconography of Nagapasa in Nepali Painting," in Himalayan Research Bulletin, Cornell University: (Ithaca, New York) Vol. 11, No. 1, Winter, pp. 12–16
 (1973) "Nepali Paintings and the Rajput Style," in Arts of Asia, Vol. 4, No. 5, Sept–Oct, pp. 38–43
 (1973) "Appreciation of Nepali Folk Art" in Swatantra Vishwa (in Nepali), a publication of USIS (United States Information Service), Kathmandu, Nepal, p. 4–7
 (1973) "Mural Paintings in the Hanuman Dhoka Palace," in Abstracts of the Conference on Nepal at Claremont, Claremont Graduate School: Claremont, pp. 28–30
 (1970) "An Introduction to Nepalese Art", in NAFA Art Magazine (Kathmandu, Nepal), Vol. 1, No. 1, pp. 23–28

Exhibition catalogs
 (2020) Virtual Exhibition of Contemporary Nepali Art by Deepak Shimkhada: SASA, California. 
 (2014) Mother as Fertility, Mother as Goddess—The Female Torsos of Laya Mainali in The Sacred Feminine: Kathmandu, Nepal.
 (1992) The Tibetan Rug: The Nepalese Connection, in Woven Jewels: Tibetan Rugs from Southern California Collections Pacific Asia Museum: Pasadena, California.
 (1991) The Eye of India: Art of the people, an exhibition curated by Deepak Shimkhada at Palos Verdes Art Center's Beckstrand Gallery, Palos Verdes, California. 
 (1982) God, Man, Woman, and Nature in Asian Art, Scripps College: Claremont, California.
 (1973) Exhibition of Nepali Art, Pomona College, Montgomery Art Gallery, Claremont, California.
 (1973) USC Collects: A Sampling of Taste, University of Southern California: Los Angeles.

Filmography

Awards and honors
 2016—CST (Claremont School of Theology) Fisher Adjunct Faculty Award for excellence in teaching
 2008--CGU (Claremont Graduate University) Distinguished Alumni Service Award
 1979--AIIS (American Institute of Indian Studies) Research Award
 1972--Fulbright (U.S. Department of State)

Personal life
Shimkhada married Kanti Shimkhada. They together have two daughters, Leepi Shimkhada-Mahalingam and Riti Shimkhada-Relan.

References

External links
 Official website  
 Official website
 
 Deepak Shimkhada at Goodreads
 

Living people
1945 births
Maharaja Sayajirao University of Baroda alumni
University of Southern California alumni
Claremont Graduate University alumni
Claremont Graduate University faculty
Nepalese male writers
Nepali-language writers
Nepalese artists
Nepalese emigrants to the United States
21st-century American writers
People from Claremont, California
American male writers
English-language writers from Nepal